Hannus is a surname. Notable people with the surname include:

Arja Hannus, Swedish orienteer
L. Adrien Hannus (born 1944), American anthropologist and archaeologist